The Culham Centre for Fusion Energy (CCFE) is the UK's national laboratory for fusion research. It is located at the Culham Science Centre, near Culham, Oxfordshire, and is the site of the Joint European Torus (JET), Mega Ampere Spherical Tokamak (MAST) and the now closed Small Tight Aspect Ratio Tokamak (START).

Formerly known as UKAEA Culham, the laboratory was renamed in October 2009 as part of organisational changes at its parent body, the United Kingdom Atomic Energy Authority (UKAEA).

Since 2016, the director has been Professor Ian Chapman, and the centre has been engaged in work towards the final detailed design of ITER as well as preparatory work in support of DEMO.

In 2014 it was announced the centre would house the new RACE (Remote Applications in Challenging Environments).

Culham Science Centre

The centre occupies the site of the former Royal Navy airfield RNAS Culham (HMS Hornbill), which was transferred to UKAEA in 1960. The UKAEA continues to operate the site and is the major tenant.

As well as CCFE, the centre houses the headquarters of the UKAEA, and hosts many commercial and other organisations.

It is also home to Upper Thames Valley Sunday league football club JET F.C.

History
UKAEA officially opened Culham Laboratory in 1965, having moved its fusion research operations from the nearby Harwell research site. Culham also amalgamated fusion activities at Aldermaston and other UK locations to form a national centre for fusion research. John Adams, who would go on to become Director-General of CERN, was appointed the first Director of the laboratory.

Culham built almost 30 different experiments in its first two decades as a variety of fusion concepts were tried out; among them shock-waves, magnetic mirror machines, stellarators and levitrons. During the 1970s, research became focused on magnetic confinement fusion using the tokamak device, which had emerged as the most promising design for a future fusion reactor. In the late 1960s, Culham scientists had already assisted in tokamak development by using laser scattering measurement techniques to verify the highly promising results achieved by the Russian T3 device. This led to the adoption of the tokamak by the majority of fusion research establishments internationally.

In 1977, following protracted negotiations, Culham was chosen as the site for the Joint European Torus (JET) tokamak. Construction began in 1978 and was completed on time and on budget, with first plasma in June 1983. Since then the machine has gone on to set a series of fusion milestones, including the first demonstration of controlled deuterium-tritium fusion power (1991) and the record fusion power output of 16 megawatts (1997). Initially the JET facility was run by a multi-national team as a separate entity on the Culham site under the JET Joint Undertaking agreement. However, since 2000, UKAEA has been responsible for the operation of JET on behalf of its European research partners, through a contract with the European Commission.

In the 1980s, Culham Laboratory was instrumental in the development of the spherical tokamak concept – a more compact version of the tokamak in which plasma is held in a tighter magnetic field in a ‘cored apple’ shape instead of the conventional toroidal configuration. This is thought to offer potential advantages by enabling smaller, more efficient fusion devices. The START (Small Tight Aspect Ratio Tokamak) experiment at Culham (1991-1998) was the first full-sized spherical tokamak. Its impressive performance led to the construction of a larger device, MAST (Mega Amp Spherical Tokamak), which operated between 2000 and 2013.

Directors
 1960–1966: John Adams
 1966–1981: Bas Pease
 1981–1990: Mick Lomer
 1990–1996: Don Sweetman
 1996–2002: Derek Robinson
 2002–2003: Frank Briscoe (Acting Director)
 2003–2008: Christopher Llewellyn Smith
 2008–2016: Steven Cowley
 2016–present: Ian Chapman

Current activities

UK fusion programme
CCFE has a broad ranging programme of activities encompassing tokamak plasma physics, technology developments for the DEMO prototype fusion power plant, the development of materials suitable for a fusion environment, engineering activities, the training of students, graduates and apprentices, and public and industry outreach activities.

It also participates in a co-ordinated European programme, which is managed by the EUROfusion consortium of research institutes. This is focussed on delivering the European fusion road map, with the goal of achieving fusion electricity by 2050.

CCFE is involved in a number of other international collaborations, notably the ITER tokamak being built at Cadarache in France. As well as contributing to scientific preparations for ITER with plasma physics experiments at Culham, CCFE is developing technology for the project – such as remote handling applications, specialist heating systems and instrumentation for plasma measurements (‘diagnostics’).

In June 2021 it was announced that a new fusion demonstration plant was to be built at the CCFE, by a consortium including General Fusion with backing from Jeff Bezos. It is planned to be operational by 2025.

MAST Upgrade
The focus of the UK domestic fusion programme is MAST Upgrade – a more powerful, better-equipped successor to the Mega Ampere Spherical Tokamak. Construction of MAST Upgrade started in 2013, and commissioning started in 2019.

MAST Upgrade will be implemented in three stages. Funding was agreed with the Engineering and Physical Sciences Research Council for the core upgrade (Stage 1a), which began plasma operations in 2020. Two additional phases (Stage 1b and Stage 2) will follow in later years subject to funding.

MAST Upgrade has three main missions:

 Make the case for a fusion Component Test Facility (CTF). A CTF would test reactor systems for DEMO, and a spherical tokamak is seen as an ideal design for the facility; 
 Add to the knowledge base for ITER and help resolve key plasma physics issues to ensure its success; 
 Test reactor systems. MAST Upgrade will be the first tokamak to trial the innovative Super-X divertor – a high-power exhaust system that reduces power loads from particles leaving the plasma. If successful, Super-X could be used in DEMO and other future fusion devices.

Joint European Torus (JET)
CCFE is responsible for the operation and safety of the JET facilities on behalf of EUROfusion. Its engineers also ensure that the JET device is maintained and upgraded to meet the demands of the research programme. Upgrades are largely carried out using a sophisticated remote handling system which avoids the need for manual entry. For example, in 2009 to 2011, remote handling engineers stripped out the interior of JET to fit a new 4,500-tile inner wall to enable researchers to test materials for the forthcoming ITER tokamak.

In addition, CCFE participates in the JET scientific programme alongside the other 28 EUROfusion research organisations throughout Europe.

Funding

Funding for CCFE's domestic fusion programme is provided by a grant from the Engineering and Physical Sciences Research Council. The operation of JET is funded under a bilateral contract between the United Kingdom Atomic Energy Authority and the European Commission.

Effect of Brexit
According to a BBC news report of 29 November 2016: "Since the vote for Brexit, many at the centre have become 'extremely nervous' amid uncertainty about future financing and freedom of movement. Five researchers have already returned to continental Europe with others said to be considering their positions".

However, some of those concerns were allayed in 2019 by the news that JET would continue to be funded after Brexit.

References

External links